Salix reinii is a species of willow native to Japan and southern Kuriles (Russia). It is a deciduous shrub, and has been found to be a pioneer species on Mt. Fuji.

References

reinii